The geology of Charon are the characteristics of the surface, crust, and interior of Pluto's moon Charon. Charon's diameter is —just over half that of Pluto. Charon is sufficiently massive to have collapsed into a spheroid under its own gravity.

History
Mutual eclipses of Pluto and Charon in the 1980s allowed astronomers to take spectra of Pluto and then the combined spectrum of the pair. By subtracting Pluto's spectrum from the total, astronomers were able to spectroscopically determine the surface composition of Charon. The northern regions of Charon are composed partially of hydrocarbons and tholins, whereas the lower latitudes are more diverse in composition.

Researchers from NASA's Ames Research Center in 2017 confirmed that icy plate tectonism occurred in the past, giving rise to many of its more prominent geological features, observing evidence of subduction of tectonic plates while also noting the absence of orogeny resulting from the freezing of the mantle.

Surface

Unlike Pluto's surface, which is composed of nitrogen and methane ices, Charon's surface appears to be dominated by the less volatile water ice. In 2007, observations by the Gemini Observatory of patches of ammonia hydrates and water crystals on the surface of Charon suggested the presence of active cryogeysers. Mutual eclipses of Pluto and Charon in the 1980s allowed astronomers to take spectra of Pluto and then the combined spectrum of the pair. By subtracting Pluto's spectrum from the total, astronomers were able to spectroscopically determine the surface composition of Charon. The northern regions of Charon are composed partially of hydrocarbons and tholins, whereas the lower latitudes are more diverse in composition. Charon also appears to have little, if any, atmosphere.

Photometric mapping of Charon's surface shows a latitudinal trend in albedo, with a bright equator band and darker poles. The south polar region is apparently darker than the north. The north polar region is dominated by a very large dark area informally dubbed "Mordor" by the New Horizons team. The Mordor Macula is distinctly red. Aside from Mordor, however, New Horizons imaged unexpectedly few other impact craters on Charon and found a youthful surface, indicating that Charon is probably geologically active. In particular, the southern hemisphere has fewer craters than the northern and is considerably less rugged, suggesting that a massive resurfacing event—perhaps prompted by the partial or complete freezing of an internal ocean—occurred at some point in the past and removed many of the earlier craters.

These are northeast-southwest trending. One system of troughs and cliffs extends for 1050 km. One such graben is Serenity Chasma which is 60 km wide. Other named chasmata are Tardis Chasma, Nostromo Chasma, and Argo Chasma which is 5 km deep.

Polar regions
Charon's north polar region, Mordor Macula, is considerably darker and more reddish than the rest of its surface. The favored explanation for this phenomenon is that it was formed by condensation of gases that escaped from Pluto's atmosphere. In winter, the temperature is −258 °C, and these gases, which include nitrogen, carbon monoxide, and methane, condense into their solid forms; when these ices are subjected to solar radiation, they chemically react to form various reddish tholins. Later, when the area is again heated by the Sun as Charon's seasons change, the temperature at the pole rises to −213 °C, resulting in the volatiles sublimating and escaping Charon, leaving only the tholins behind. Over millions of years, the residual tholin builds up thick layers, obscuring the icy crust. The south polar region is also dark, and was imaged by New Horizons using sunlight reflected off Pluto.

Geological mapping
A geomorphological map published in 2019 classifies Charon's surface into 16 types, including: blocky terrain, smooth terrain, elevated smooth terrain, rough terrain, mottled terrain, lobate aprons, and Mons, depressed material, craters and crater ejecta. Linear features were classified as catena, crater rim crest, depression margin, graben trace, groove, ridge crest, scarp base, scarp crest, or broad warp. Different time periods were labelled Ozian (older than 4 billion years, exposed in a region titled Oz Terra). The Vulcanian is next and features cryoflows, mainly near the equator in an area called Vulcan Planum. The Spokian is the period when impact craters have formed.

Interior
Charon's volume and mass allow calculation of its density, which is slightly lower than Pluto's and hence Charon has a slightly lower proportion of rock in its interior relative to Pluto. This difference is not as large as those of many other collisional satellites. Prior to New Horizons, there were two conflicting theories about Charon's internal structure: some scientists thought it to be a differentiated body like Pluto, with a rocky core and an icy mantle, whereas others thought it would be uniform throughout. Evidence in support of the former position was found in 2007, when observations by the Gemini Observatory of patches of ammonia hydrates and water crystals on the surface of Charon suggested the presence of active cryogeysers. The fact that the ice was still in crystalline form suggested it had been deposited recently, because solar radiation would have degraded it to an amorphous state after roughly 30,000 years.

References

Charon (moon)
Charon